is a Japanese former swimmer. He competed in the men's 200 metre backstroke at the 1964 Summer Olympics. He later became a reporter for the Sports Nippon newspaper, eventually rising to become a member of the board of directors. He also did sports commentary on television.

References

External links
 

1942 births
Living people
Japanese male backstroke swimmers
Olympic swimmers of Japan
Swimmers at the 1964 Summer Olympics
Place of birth missing (living people)